The Black Sea Cycling Tour is a cycling race held in Bulgaria. It is part of UCI Europe Tour in category 2.2.

Winners

References

Cycle races in Bulgaria
2015 establishments in Bulgaria
Recurring sporting events established in 2015
UCI Europe Tour races